Emmanuel Kwadwo Agyekum is the Member of Parliament for Nkoranza South Constituency in the Bono East Region of Ghana. In May 2022, he claimed the Ghana Police shot live bullets during the Nkoranza shooting and urged Ghanaians to rise against police brutalities.

Personal life 
Emmanuel is a Christian (Seventh-day Adventist).

Early life and education 
He was born on 3 December 1973 in Nkoranza in the Bono East Region of Ghana. He attended University of Westminster in London, UK where he obtained MA in Global Business in 2007. He also had IMBA  at International Graduate Center. He further went to University of Applied Science in Bremen, Germany in 2008.

Politics 
He is a member of National Democratic Congress. He won the Nkoranza South Constituency parliamentary seat with 29,408 votes making 56.8% of total votes cast whilst the NPP parliamentary candidate Konadu-Yiadom Charles had 22,219 votes making 42.9% of the total votes cast and the PNC candidate Florence Ampour had 121 votes making 0.2% of the total votes cast.

He was the former Deputy Minister of Local Government.

Committees 
He is a member of the Subsidiary Legislation Committee and also a member of the Works and Housing Committee.

Employment 
He was the CEO of Special Care Recruitment Consultancy in London, UK. He was also the Municipal Chief Executive of Nkoranza South Municipality from May 2009- January 2013.

References 

1973 births
Living people
People from Bono East Region
National Democratic Congress (Ghana) politicians
Alumni of the University of Westminster